Charles Dean Hayes (né Fout), better known by his stage name Chick McGee, is a radio personality who appears on The Bob & Tom Show. The name "Chick McGee" is a pseudonym connected with the Jack McGee character on The Incredible Hulk.

Personal life
McGee was born November 26, 1957, in London, Ohio. He has three children and has been married and divorced three times.

Education
McGee graduated from London High School in 1976. McGee briefly "visited" The Ohio State University and graduated from an independent broadcast school in June 1976. In 2014 he was inducted in the inaugural class of the Fine Arts Hall of Fame of the London City Schools.

Professional career
He began his career at a small 1,000-watt radio station in West Virginia and held various on-air positions at stations in West Virginia and Ohio. Prior to joining The Bob and Tom Show, he went by the name Chuck Mikelz. On April 1, 1985, Chick joined The Bob & Tom Show. In January 1995, Chick left The Bob and Tom Show to become co-host of a show called Kevin & McGee at KGB-FM in San Diego, California. After six months in San Diego, McGee returned on July 10, 1995 to his former job on The Bob & Tom Show.

The Bob and Tom Show
McGee joined The Bob & Tom Show on April 1, 1986, as the show's announcer. His duties expanded to include recapping the day's sports news and being the show's comic foil.

Off the Air Podcast / The Chick McGee Show 
McGee started podcasting on July 24, 2012. It is regularly hosted by Chick and his (former) girlfriend Jessica Hooker. The podcast is an insightful look into his off-air personality. Chick talks about Fat Kid Weekends, Anger Sweats, who he would never allow on his podcast, and off-air radio stories.

It was revealed in a very personal podcast with Dr. Will Miller that Chick and Jessica were no longer romantically involved. While they are separated, the two both expressed hope to salvage the relationship in the future. In subsequent podcasts, both Chick and Jessica expressed that they were more proud of the podcast with Dr. Will than any single piece of work in their careers.

After 188 episodes as the Off the Air Podcast, McGee's podcast was renamed The Chick McGee Show on July 3, 2016.

TruLuv Sports
In 2014, Chick McGee was hired as a writer for the online sports website TruLuvSports.com. He has written about the Washington Commanders and Ray Rice.

References

External links 

 
 

Living people
Ohio State University alumni
People from Indianapolis
People from London, Ohio
1957 births